Parthenina  varia is a species of sea snail, a marine gastropod mollusk in the family Pyramidellidae, the pyrams and their allies.

Description
The shell grows to a length of 3.1 mm.

Distribution
This marine species occurs in the following locations:
 Gulf of Mexico (Louisiana, Texas)

References

External links
 To Encyclopedia of Life
 To World Register of Marine Species

Pyramidellidae
Gastropods described in 1993